Mister CR is an underground independent hip-hop artist from South Los Angeles, California (formally known as "South Central Los Angeles".)

Career

Mister CR began rapping when he first performed at "The Good Life Cafe", where as time progressed, he gained recognition for his skills as an emcee. He is known for his unique delivery which consists of fast multi-syllabic rhymes.

His latest project is "All Green Everything" which was released July 23, 2015.

Discography

Mixtapes and EPs

Dead On The Dance Floor (2011)
Unsolicited Material (2011)
Mister CR and DJ Seedless presents "the Def Satellite" (2012)
Good Life Bullyz Old School Mixtape (2012)
Bully Business (2013)
QuiCC tEasEr EP (2013)
4 Hustlas only (2014)
The Perspective of a Good Life Bully(2014)
ALL GREEN EVERYTHING(2015)

Other related releases
 2014 : Mister Cr feat. Color da Hustla - Fucc Everybody
 2016 : Mister CR feat. Macc Niph - Westcoast Bound prod. Ill Slim Collin
 2018 : Mister CR  feat. Fox Jones - Shooters 
 2020 : Mister CR feat. Ktoefornia - Ape Shit prod. Hash Beatz

References

Living people
American hip hop musicians
Year of birth missing (living people)
Project Blowed
Rappers from Los Angeles
People from South Los Angeles